Aporodes floralis is a moth of the family Crambidae described by Jacob Hübner in 1809. It is found in most of Europe (except Ireland, Great Britain, the Benelux, Fennoscandia and the Baltic region), Algeria, Syria, Afghanistan, central Asia, north-western India and Yemen

The wingspan is 15–20 mm. The forewings are deep purple, suffused with blackish or greyish brown and with well defined cross lines. Adults are on wing from May to the beginning of October in two generations per year.

The larvae feed on Cynara cardunculus and Convolvulus arvensis.

External links

Moths described in 1809
Odontiini
Moths of Europe
Moths of Africa
Moths of Asia